The Lords of Council and Session comprise the most senior body of Scottish judges:

 Privy Council of Scotland, up to 1532 
 Court of Session, 1532–present
 Inner House, 1810–present